Andruzzi is a surname. Notable people with the surname include:

Joe Andruzzi (born 1975), American football player
Tony Andruzzi (1925–1991), American musician